The Best Days of My Life is an album by American pop singer Johnny Mathis that was released on January 29, 1979, by Columbia Records and scaled back considerably on his more than decade-long practice of recording recent hit songs by other artists. He did, however, cover two standards: "As Time Goes By" and "Begin the Beguine", the latter of which is given a disco arrangement.

The album made its first appearance on Billboard magazine's Top LP's & Tapes chart in the issue dated February 24, 1979, and remained there for seven weeks, peaking at number 122. It also made it to number 38 during a five-week run on the UK album chart.

The first song from the album to reach any of the charts in Billboard was a duet with Jane Olivor titled "The Last Time I Felt Like This" that was written for the 1978 film Same Time, Next Year and was nominated for the Academy Award for Best Original Song but lost to "Last Dance" from Thank God It's Friday. The duet entered the magazine's list of the 50 most popular Easy Listening records in the US in the issue dated February 24, 1979, and peaked at number 15 over the course of 12 weeks.
Another track from the album, "Begin the Beguine", entered that same chart five months later, in the July 21 issue, and got as high as number 37 during its five weeks there. The only song from the album to reach the UK singles chart was "Gone, Gone, Gone", which made its debut there the following month, on August 11, and reached number 15 during a 10-week run.

The album was first released on compact disc in 1989, and on January 27, 2015, Funkytowngrooves released an expanded edition of the album on compact disc that included five bonus tracks, two of which were disco mixes that came out in 1979 on a separate 12-inch single.

Reception

People magazine said in its review that "Mathis here returns to the venue that best suits his soft and breathy style" (meaning ballads).  The reviewer also references characters in the 1942 film Casablanca in praising the Mathis rendition of "As Time Goes By":  "If Sam had sung it so well, Bogey would actually have uttered that famous nonline, 'Play it again.'"

Track listing

Side one
 "Would You Like to Spend the Night with Me" (L. Russell Brown, Irwin Levine) – 3:02
 "As Time Goes By" (Herman Hupfeld) – 4:35
 "The Best Days of My Life" (Cheryl Christiansen, Arnold Goland, Jack Gold) – 3:30
 "Gone, Gone, Gone" (L. Russell Brown, Lisa Hayward) – 3:32
 "The Bottom Line" (Dennis Lambert, Brian Potter) – 3:56

Side two
 "The Last Time I Felt Like This"  performed with Jane Olivor  (Alan Bergman, Marilyn Bergman, Marvin Hamlisch) – 2:57
 "Begin the Beguine" (Cole Porter) – 4:16
 "How Can I Make It on My Own" (Terry Bradford, Nat Kipner) – 4:00
 "There You Are" (Nancy Goland) – 4:12
 "We're in Love" (Patti Austin) – 3:45

Remixes

A separate 12-inch single that featured extended dance mixes of two songs from the album was also released in 1979.

Side one
"Begin the Beguine" (Special Disco Version) (Cole Porter) – 8:28
Disco Mix by Steve Thompson
Engineered by Michael Barbiero

Side two
"Gone, Gone, Gone" (Special Disco Version) (L. Russell Brown, Lisa Hayward) – 6:30
Disco Mix by John Luongo
Engineered by Michael Barbiero

Funkytowngrooves CD bonus tracks
From the liner notes for the 2014 CD release:
"Begin the Beguine" (Single Mix) (Porter) – 3:56
"Begin the Beguine" (Disco Mix) (Porter) – 8:28
"Gone, Gone, Gone" (Disco Mix) (L. Russell Brown, Lisa Hayward) – 6:29
"Begin the Beguine" (Instrumental) (Porter) – 3:56
"I Never Said I Love You" (Hal David, Archie Jordan) – 3:38

2017 CD bonus track
This album's CD release as part of the 2017 box set The Voice of Romance: The Columbia Original Album Collection also included "I Never Said I Love You".

Recording dates
From the liner notes for The Voice of Romance: The Columbia Original Album Collection:
August 23, 1978 – "How Can I Make It on My Own", "I Never Said I Love You"
September 5, 1978 – "As Time Goes By", "Would You Like to Spend the Night with Me"
September 14, 1978 – "The Bottom Line", "There You Are", "We're in Love"
September 15, 1978 – "Begin the Beguine", "Gone, Gone, Gone", "The Last Time I Felt Like This"
November 10, 1978 – "The Best Days of My Life"

Song information

Rudy Vallee was the first artist to make the charts in Billboard magazine with "As Time Goes By" when he took the song to number 15 in 1931, but after the song was featured in the film Casablanca his recording was reissued and spent four weeks at number one in 1943. "Begin the Beguine" was first put on the charts by Xavier Cugat & His Waldorf-Astoria Orchestra with Don Reid on vocal for two weeks in 1935 when it reached number 13. Patti Austin's "We're in Love" made it to number 90 on the magazine's R&B chart in February 1978, and the Expanded Edition CD bonus track "I Never Said I Love You" was first recorded by Barbara Mandrell for her 1976 album Midnight Angel but was a number 84 pop hit for Orsa Lia that also spent a week at number one on the magazine's Easy Listening chart in 1979.

The liner notes included with the Funkytowngrooves reissue featured a 2014 interview with one of the songwriters of "The Bottom Line", Dennis Lambert, in which he describes the excitement that he and the song's other composer, Brian Potter, felt about the decision to include their song on the album.  "'It was one of the highlights of our career as songwriters and remains so to this day. His version...was exactly what we were hoping it would be."

Personnel

Original album
From the liner notes for the original album:

Performers
Johnny Mathis – vocals
Jane Olivor – vocals ("The Last Time I Felt Like This")
Bill Green – saxophone solo ("The Bottom Line")
Plas Johnson – saxophone solo ("As Time Goes By")
Greg Phillinganes – synthesizer solo ("Would You Like to Spend the Night with Me", "There You Are")

Production
Jack Gold – producer 
Gene Page – arranger, conductor 
Dick Bogert – recording engineer, mixing engineer
Ray Gerhardt – recording engineer
Larry Forkner – recording engineer
Jo-Anne Steinberg – production coordinator
David Vance – photographer
Mixed at Hollywood Sound

Funkytowngrooves reissue
From the liner notes for the 2014 CD release:
Tony Calvert – reissue producer
Jeff James – reissue coordinator
Matt Murphy – production manager
Craig Turnbull - release coordinator
Wallace Create – package design
Alex Henderson – liner notes
Matt Bauer - liner notes and research
Randy Mahon - artist/musician interview coordinator
Mastered by Sean Brennan at Battery Studios, New York City, from the original master tapes

References

Bibliography

 

1979 albums
Johnny Mathis albums
Albums arranged by Gene Page
Columbia Records albums
Albums recorded at A&M Studios